The elections for the Shimla Municipal Corporation are speculated to be around after March 2023.

List of wards

Total 41 ward in 2022 MC election.

Schedule

Parties and alliances







Result

See also

2017 Shimla Municipal Corporation election
Shimla Municipal Corporation

References

Shimla
Shimla
Shimla
Local body elections in Himachal Pradesh